Nathael Sagard (born 17 December 1967) is a Canadian former cyclist. He competed in the individual road race at the 1992 Summer Olympics.

References

External links
 

1967 births
Living people
Canadian male cyclists
Olympic cyclists of Canada
Cyclists at the 1992 Summer Olympics
Cyclists from Quebec City